Alia Guagni (born 1 October 1987) is an Italian professional footballer who plays as a defender for Italian Serie A club AC Milan and the Italy women's national team.

Club career
She previously played for ACF Firenze and Fiorentina.

Career transfers and statistics 
We are going to show you the list of football clubs and seasons in which Alia Guagni has played. It includes the total number of appearance (caps), substitution details, goals, yellow and red cards stats.

International goals

Honours

Club
ACF Firenze
 Serie B: 2002–03
 Serie A2: 2005–06, 2009–10

Fiorentina
 Serie A: 2016–17
 Coppa Italia: 2016–17, 2017–18
 Supercoppa Italiana: 2018

Atlético Madrid
 Supercopa de España Femenina: 2020–21

Individual
Serie A Female Footballer of the Year: 2017, 2018
AIC Best Women's XI: 2019, 2020

References

External links 

 

1987 births
Living people
Italian women's footballers
Italy women's international footballers
Serie A (women's football) players
Women's association football defenders
Fiorentina Women's F.C. players
2019 FIFA Women's World Cup players
Italian expatriate sportspeople in Spain
Expatriate women's footballers in Spain
Footballers from Florence
ACF Firenze players
Italian expatriate women's footballers
Atlético Madrid Femenino players
A.C. Milan Women players
Primera División (women) players
UEFA Women's Euro 2017 players